The soundtrack from the controversial Australian TV series, Underbelly was released on 29 March 2008. It features some of the songs from various artists that played in episodes, and includes elements of the score by Burkhard Dallwitz.

Track listing

CD Release
As listed at various sources

"It's A Jungle Out There" Burkhard Dallwitz
"Coca-Cola" Little Red
"We Don't Walk" The Paper Scissors
"Sticky Fingers" Jamaica Jam
"My Pal" GOD
"Don't Fight It" The Panics
"They Call It Love?....Wow" Evelyn Morris
"Sorry" The Easybeats
"The Giraffe" Vulgargrad
"La Musique" Riot in Belgium
"These Are Our Children" I Monster
"12 Gates to the City" Suzie Higgie
"Molasses in the Moonlight" Jack & Misty
"One Night Alone" Winterpark
"The Carnival Is Over" Nick Cave & The Bad Seeds
"Cyclone on Ceylon" Oleg Kostrow
"Mon Cheri (v2)" Klaus Wusthoff
"Underbelly Suite" Burkhard Dallwitz

Alternative listing
The iTunes Store has a slightly different listing.

"It's A Jungle Out There" Burkhard Dallwitz
"Coca-Cola" Little Red
"We Don't Walk" The Paper Scissors
"Sticky Fingers" Jamaica Jam
"My Pal" GOD
"Don't Fight It" The Panics
"The Call It Love?....Wow" Evelyn Morris
"Sorry" The Easybeats
"Wishing Well" Symbiosis
"The Giraffe" Vulgargrad
"La Musique" Riot in Belgium
"These Are Our Children" I Monster
"12 Gates to the City" Suzie Higgie
"Molasses in the Moonlight" Jack & Misty
"One Night Alone" Winterpark
"The Carnival is Over" Nick Cave & The Bad Seeds
"Cyclone on Ceylon" Oleg Kostrow
"Underbelly Suite" Burkhard Dallwitz

Omitted Tracks
These tracks that were not included in this album release but were played in the series:
"Come on Come On" Little Birdy
"Shazam!" Spiderbait
"La Donna E Mobile" Verdi
"Black Betty" Spiderbait
"Fucken Awesome" Spiderbait
"Stop the Sun" The Vacant Lanes
"I Still Pray" Kasey Chambers & Paul Kelly
"Tarantula" Pendulum featuring Fresh $Pyda & Tenor Fly
"The Girl of My Dreams (Is Giving Me Nightmares)" Machine Gun Fellatio
"Bring It On" Fdel
"four on the floor" Spiderbait
"Party Up (Up in Here)" DMX
"Apple Pie (Skylab Remix)" Coco Electrik
"Burn It Up" The Cheats
"Get Up Morning" Eddy Current Suppression Ring

See also
Underbelly (TV series)

References

Television soundtracks
2008 soundtrack albums